Bruno & Boots is a Canadian series of television films, based on Gordon Korman's Macdonald Hall series of young adult novels. The films are produced by Aircraft Pictures for YTV, and star Callan Potter as Boots and Jonny Gray as Bruno.

The first film in the series, Go Jump in the Pool!, aired in 2016, while the second and third films in the series, This Can't Be Happening at Macdonald Hall and The Wizzle War, aired in 2017. This Can't Be Happening at Macdonald Hall received a Canadian Screen Award nomination for Best Limited Series or Program at the 6th Canadian Screen Awards in 2018.

References

2016 Canadian television series debuts
2010s Canadian children's television series
Canadian television films
YTV (Canadian TV channel) original programming
Television series by 9 Story Media Group